The Big Appeal (Cricket’s Day of Giving) was a set of three cricketing events on 8 and 9 February 2020 aimed at raising relief for those affected by the 2019–20 Australian bushfire season. The three events included the ‘Bushfire Cricket Bash’, the Commonwealth Bank Women’s Tri-Series T20I match between India and Australia and the final of the Big Bash League (BBL). All profits and funds went to the  Australian Red Cross Disaster Relief and Recovery Fund. The Bushfire Cricket Bash raised $7.7 million.

Bushfire relief match 
The Bushfire Cricket Bash was a T10 format match which took place on 9 February 2020. It featured former leading cricketers from around the world. Some former male cricketing stars that took part were Adam Gilchrist, Andrew Symonds, Brad Haddin, Matthew Hayden, Wasim Akram and Yuvraj Singh; female stars included Elyse Villani, Alex Blackwell and Phoebe Litchfield. Sportsmen from other codes who participated included Cameron Smith, Luke Hodge and Nick Riewoldt. Sachin Tendulkar and Tim Paine appeared as coaches. Adam Gilchrist and Ricky Ponting were the captains.

During the innings break, Ellyse Perry and recent debutant, Annabel Sutherland, bowled to Sachin Tendulkar, in his first time batting in almost 6 years.

Ponting XI won the one-off match by 1 run. The match raised $7.7 million for relief efforts.

Team lists

One-off match

Australia Women v India Women

BBL09 Final

References 

2020 in Australian cricket
Big Bash League
Charity events in Australia
Bushfires in Australia